Cahalane is a surname. Notable people with the surname include:

 Conor Cahalane (born 1997), Irish hurler and Gaelic footballer
 Damien Cahalane (born 1992), Irish hurler and Gaelic footballer
 Michael Cahalane (born 1995), Irish hurler
 Mitch Cahalane (born 1989), Australian rugby league player
 Niall Cahalane (born 1963), Irish Gaelic footballer

See also
 Cahalan, surname